The following species in the genus Vicia, the vetches, are accepted by Plants of the World Online. The taxonomy of this economically important genus remains unresolved, which hinders the development of underutilized crop species.

Vicia abbreviata 
Vicia acutifolia 
Vicia afghanica 
Vicia aintabensis 
Vicia aktoensis 
Vicia alpestris 
Vicia altissima 
Vicia americana 
Vicia amoena 
Vicia amurensis 
Vicia anatolica 
Vicia andicola 
Vicia andina 
Vicia anguste-pinnata 
Vicia aphylla 
Vicia araucana 
Vicia argaea 
Vicia argentea 
Vicia armena 
Vicia articulata 
Vicia assyriaca 
Vicia aucheri 
Vicia bakeri 
Vicia balansae 
Vicia basaltica 
Vicia benghalensis 
Vicia benthamiana 
Vicia berteroana 
Vicia biebersteinii 
Vicia biennis 
Vicia bifolia 
Vicia bifoliolata 
Vicia bijuga 
Vicia bithynica 
Vicia brulloi 
Vicia bungei 
Vicia caesarea 
Vicia canescens 
Vicia cappadocica 
Vicia capreolata 
Vicia caroliniana 
Vicia cassia 
Vicia cassubica 
Vicia caucasica 
Vicia cedretorum 
Vicia chaetocalyx 
Vicia chianschanensis 
Vicia chinensis 
Vicia chosenensis 
Vicia ciceroidea 
Vicia ciliatula 
Vicia coquimbensis 
Vicia costae 
Vicia costata 
Vicia cracca 
Vicia cretica 
Vicia crocea 
Vicia cusnae 
Vicia cuspidata 
Vicia cypria 
Vicia dadianorum 
Vicia dalmatica 
Vicia davisii 
Vicia dennesiana 
Vicia dichroantha 
Vicia dionysiensis 
Vicia disperma 
Vicia dumetorum 
Vicia epetiolaris 
Vicia eriocarpa 
Vicia eristalioides 
Vicia ervilia 
Vicia erzurumica 
Vicia esdraelonensis 
Vicia faba 
Vicia fairchildiana 
Vicia fauriei 
Vicia fedtschenkoana 
Vicia ferreirensis 
Vicia filicaulis 
Vicia floridana 
Vicia freyniana 
Vicia fulgens 
Vicia galeata 
Vicia galilaea 
Vicia garinensis 
Vicia geminiflora 
Vicia giacominiana 
Vicia glareosa 
Vicia glauca 
Vicia gracilior 
Vicia graminea 
Vicia grandiflora 
Vicia × guyotii 
Vicia hassei 
Vicia hatschbachii 
Vicia hirsuta 
Vicia hololasia 
Vicia hulensis 
Vicia humilis 
Vicia hyaeniscyamus 
Vicia hybrida 
Vicia hyrcanica 
Vicia iberica 
Vicia incana 
Vicia inconspicua 
Vicia iranica 
Vicia janeae 
Vicia japonica 
Vicia johannis 
Vicia jordanovii 
Vicia kalakhensis 
Vicia khokhriakovii 
Vicia kioshanica 
Vicia koeieana 
Vicia kokanica 
Vicia kotschyana 
Vicia kulingana 
Vicia kurdica 
Vicia laeta 
Vicia lanceolata 
Vicia larissae 
Vicia lathyroides 
Vicia latibracteolata 
Vicia lecomtei 
Vicia lens 
Vicia lenticula 
Vicia lentoides 
Vicia leucantha 
Vicia leucomalla 
Vicia leucophaea 
Vicia lilacina 
Vicia linearifolia 
Vicia loiseleurii 
Vicia lomensis 
Vicia ludoviciana 
Vicia lunata 
Vicia lutea 
Vicia macrantha 
Vicia macrograminea 
Vicia magellanica 
Vicia megalotropis 
Vicia melanops 
Vicia menziesii 
Vicia michauxii 
Vicia micrantha 
Vicia minutiflora 
Vicia modesta 
Vicia mollis 
Vicia monantha 
Vicia monardii 
Vicia montbretii 
Vicia montenegrina 
Vicia montevidensis 
Vicia mucronata 
Vicia mulleriana 
Vicia multicaulis 
Vicia multijuga 
Vicia murbeckii 
Vicia nana 
Vicia narbonensis 
Vicia nataliae 
Vicia nigricans 
Vicia nipponica 
Vicia noeana 
Vicia nummularia 
Vicia ocalensis 
Vicia ochroleuca 
Vicia ohwiana 
Vicia olchonensis 
Vicia onobrychioides 
Vicia orientalis 
Vicia oroboides 
Vicia orobus 
Vicia palaestina 
Vicia pallida 
Vicia pampicola 
Vicia pannonica 
Vicia parviflora 
Vicia parvula 
Vicia paucifolia 
Vicia pectinata 
Vicia peregrina 
Vicia perelegans 
Vicia peruviana 
Vicia pinetorum 
Vicia pisiformis 
Vicia platensis 
Vicia popovii 
Vicia pseudocassubica 
Vicia pseudo-orobus 
Vicia pubescens 
Vicia pulchella 
Vicia pyrenaica 
Vicia qatmensis 
Vicia quadrijuga 
Vicia ramosissima 
Vicia ramuliflora 
Vicia raynaudii 
Vicia rigidula 
Vicia sativa 
Vicia scandens 
Vicia semenovii 
Vicia semiglabra 
Vicia sepium 
Vicia sericocarpa 
Vicia serratifolia 
Vicia sessei 
Vicia sessiliflora 
Vicia setifolia 
Vicia sibthorpii 
Vicia sicula 
Vicia sinaica 
Vicia singarensis 
Vicia sosnowskyi 
Vicia sparsiflora 
Vicia splendens 
Vicia stenophylla 
Vicia subrotunda 
Vicia subserrata 
Vicia subvillosa 
Vicia sylvatica 
Vicia taipaica 
Vicia tenera 
Vicia tenoi 
Vicia tenuifolia 
Vicia tenuissima 
Vicia tephrosioides 
Vicia ternata 
Vicia tetrantha 
Vicia tetrasperma 
Vicia tibetica 
Vicia tigridis 
Vicia × tikeliana 
Vicia tsydenii 
Vicia unijuga 
Vicia uralensis 
Vicia variegata 
Vicia venosa 
Vicia venulosa 
Vicia vicina 
Vicia vicioides 
Vicia villosa 
Vicia voggenreiteriana 
Vicia vulcanorum 
Vicia woroschilovii 
Vicia wushanica 
Vicia × zabelii

References

Vicia